Conductor 1492 is a 1924 American silent comedy film directed by Charles Hines and starring Johnny Hines. It was produced and distributed by Warner Bros.

Plot
As described in a review of the film in a film magazine, Terence O’Toole (Hines) leaves his old home in Ireland to seek his fortune in America. He becomes "Conductor 1492" on a trolley car belonging to a system which both the president and vice-president are struggling to gain control. The final outcome of this fight depends on two shares of stock which are missing and which if not found will bring disgrace to President Connelly. The villain produces two forged shares but Johnny’s father saves the day by producing the real shares, which he bought a number of years before. In the meantime Terence has fallen in love with Connelly’s daughter and he gets her as his reward.

Cast

Box office
According to Warner Bros records the film earned $300,000 domestic and $34,000 foreign.

Preservation
Conductor 1492 film has been preserved at several archives, including the Library of Congress, George Eastman House, and the UCLA Film and Television Archive. This version has been broadcast on television and cable. A mute print was transferred onto 16mm film by Associated Artists Productions/United Artists in the 1950s, and preserved at the Wisconsin Center for Film and Theater Research.

References

External links

Conductor 1492 part 1 available for free download at Internet Archive (pt.2, pt.3)

1924 films
American silent feature films
Warner Bros. films
American black-and-white films
Films directed by Charles Hines
1924 comedy films
Silent American comedy films
1920s American films